Joseph Georges Roger Pelletier (born June 22, 1945) is a Canadian former professional ice hockey player. He played in one NHL game for the Philadelphia Flyers during the 1967–68 NHL season.

Pelletier was born in Montreal, Quebec. He played junior hockey with the Quebec Citadelles, the Quebec Aces junior team, and Thetford Mines Aces. He joined the Quebec Aces for a game in 1965–66, then played full-time for the Aces in 1966–67. Pelletier played for Quebec until 1970, when he joined the Richmond Robins. He played for Richmond until February 1974 when he was traded to the Springfield Kings.

See also
List of players who played only one game in the NHL

External links
 
Flyers History Profile

1945 births
Living people
Canadian ice hockey defencemen
Ice hockey people from Montreal
Philadelphia Flyers players
Quebec Aces (AHL) players
Richmond Robins players
Springfield Kings players